Nicolás Emanuel Torres (born 10 October 1983 in Concepción del Uruguay, Entre Ríos) is an Argentine footballer who plays for Mexican club Atlante in the Primera División de Mexico.

Torres started his career with local team Club Gimnasia y Esgrima (Concepción del Uruguay). In 2004, he joined Club Atlético Tigre and helped the team win promotion from the 3rd division to the Argentine Primera.

In 2008 Torres joined Colón de Santa Fe of the Argentine Primera.

Titles

Career statistics

External links
 Argentine Primera statistics

1983 births
Living people
Sportspeople from Entre Ríos Province
Argentine footballers
Argentine expatriate footballers
Association football midfielders
Argentine Primera División players
Primera Nacional players
Liga MX players
Club Atlético Tigre footballers
Club Atlético Colón footballers
Atlante F.C. footballers
Expatriate footballers in Mexico